Mike Tyson vs. James Smith, billed as Super Fight, was a professional boxing match contested on March 7, 1987 for the WBA and WBC heavyweight championships, as part of the heavyweight unification series.

Background
Mike Tyson was coming off a dominating victory over Trevor Berbick in which he captured the WBC Heavyweight championship after knocking out Berbick in the second round. Tyson's next opponent would be the WBA Heavyweight champion James "Bonecrusher" Smith, who had knocked out Tim Witherspoon in the first round to capture the title four months earlier. The stakes for the fight were high as not only would the winner unify the WBA and WBC titles, but they would also get to face undefeated IBF Heavyweight champion Michael Spinks to determine the next Undisputed Heavyweight champion. However, only a month before the fight, Spinks would vacate his IBF title, instead choosing to defend his remaining Lineal Heavyweight championship against Gerry Cooney, temporarily putting plans to find the next Undisputed Heavyweight Champion on hold.

The fight
Though Smith became one of the few men to last the entire 12 rounds with Tyson, he offered little offense during the fight, instead constantly grappling with Tyson in an effort to reduce the effectiveness of Tyson's punches. Because of the excessive holding, referee Mills Lane twice took a point away from Smith, first in second round, and then again in the eighth. Smith's best offensive pressure arguably was during the fight's final seconds in which he was able to land a right hand to the head of Tyson. Tyson would earn the victory by way of unanimous decision, winning every round on all three of the judges scorecards. Afterwards, Tyson was critical of Smith's tactics, "When I was trying to put the punches together he grabbed. This hurts boxing. This is show business. People expect a performance"

Undercard
Tyrell Biggs knocks out David Bey at 2:18 of round 6
Azumah Nelson knocks out Mauro Gutierrez in Round 6 to retain his WBC Featherweight Title.

Aftermath
Mike Tyson would next defend his title against former WBC champ Pinklon Thomas, earning the victory by way of 6th round technical knockout. Meanwhile, the IBF organized a match between Tony Tucker and a then-unknown James "Buster" Douglas to determine who would be their heavyweight champion, with Tucker dispatching Douglas in the 10th round by technical knockout. This would set up the much anticipated Tyson–Tucker fight to determine the next undisputed champion. For the second time in three fights, Tyson went the full 12 rounds, eventually defeating Tucker by unanimous decision.

References

1987 in boxing
Boxing in Las Vegas
1987 in sports in Nevada
Smith
World Boxing Association heavyweight championship matches
World Boxing Council heavyweight championship matches
March 1987 sports events in the United States
Westgate Las Vegas